SOS Pacific is a 1959 British adventure drama film directed by Guy Green and starring Richard Attenborough, Pier Angeli, John Gregson, Eva Bartok and Eddie Constantine. The film was shot in black and white, but later underwent colourisation.

Plot synopsis
A flying boat is forced to ditch in the Pacific during a thunderstorm. Aboard are the owner-pilot Jack Bennett (John Gregson), the navigator Willy (Cec Linder), the flight attendant Teresa (Pier Angeli) and six passengers: a policeman, Petersen (Clifford Evans); his prisoner Mark (Eddie Constantine); Whitey Mullen (Richard Attenborough), a witness against Mark; Dr Strauss, a German scientist (Gunnar Möller); Miss Shaw, a middle-aged Englishwoman (Jean Anderson) and Maria, a young European woman (Eva Bartok).

The plane comes down near an island. The navigator has been killed by toxic gas produced when the wrong kind of extinguisher is used on an electrical fire aboard the plane but the others make it to land in two rubber dinghies. Just offshore a fleet of derelict ships is anchored. On the island are two concrete bunkers. In one,  a number of goats are tethered. The other, which is lead-lined, contains cameras and measuring instruments.  The cameras are trained on a device standing on a smaller island some distance away.

The castaways realise that they are in the middle of an H-Bomb testing range and that a bomb is to be detonated in a few hours.

Cast
 Richard Attenborough as Whitey Mullen
 Pier Angeli as Teresa
 John Gregson as Jack Bennett
 Eva Bartok as Maria
 Eddie Constantine as Mark Reisner
 Jean Anderson as Miss Shaw
 Cec Linder as Willy
 Clifford Evans as Petersen
 Gunnar Möller as Krauss
 Harold Kasket as Monk (as Harold Kaskett)
 Andrew Faulds as Sea Captain
 Cyril Shaps as Louis
 Tom Bowman as Alberto

References

External links
 
 

1959 films
1950s thriller films
British thriller films
British black-and-white films
Films about aviation accidents or incidents
Films directed by Guy Green
Films about nuclear war and weapons
Films about sharks
Films set in Oceania
Films set on uninhabited islands
Films shot in the Canary Islands
1950s English-language films
1950s British films